The 2000–01 Arizona Wildcats men's basketball team represented the University of Arizona in the 2000–01 NCAA Division I men's basketball season. The head coach was Lute Olson. The team played its home games in the McKale Center in Tucson, Arizona, and was a member of the Pacific-10 Conference.  The Wildcats finished the season second behind Stanford in the Pacific-10 conference with a 15–3 record.  Arizona reached the National Championship game in the 2001 NCAA Division I men's basketball tournament, losing to Duke 82–72 and finishing the season with a 28–8 record.

Roster

Depth chart

Schedule and results

|-
!colspan=9 style="background:#; color:white;"| Regular season

|-
!colspan=9 style="background:#;"| NCAA tournament

|-

NCAA basketball tournament
Midwest
Arizona (#2 seed) 101, Eastern Illinois 76
Arizona 73, Butler 52
Arizona 66, Mississippi 56
Arizona 87, Illinois 81

Final Four
Arizona 80, Michigan State 61
Duke 82, Arizona 72

Awards and honors

Rankings

*AP does not release post-NCAA Tournament rankings^Coaches did not release a week 2 poll

Team players drafted into the NBA

References

Arizona Wildcats men's basketball seasons
Arizona Wildcats
NCAA Division I men's basketball tournament Final Four seasons
Arizona
Arizona Wildcats
Arizona Wildcats